Ben Hugh Guill (September 8, 1909 – January 15, 1994) was a short-term Republican member of the United States House of Representatives from Texas's 18th congressional district, which then encompassed the Panhandle counties. He won a special election and served the remaining eight months in office.

Early life and education
Guill was born in Smyrna in Rutherford County in central Tennessee. He graduated in 1933 from West Texas A&M University in Canyon, Texas, then known as West Texas State College.

Career
Guill worked as an educator before becoming a business executive, and a real estate agent. From 1942 to 1945 during World War II, he served in the United States Navy.

Guill won a special election to the Eighty-first Congress to fill the vacancy created by the resignation of Representative Eugene Worley. Guill served the remaining term from May 6, 1950 to January 3, 1951. In the November 1950 general election, he was unsuccessful in his bid for reelection to a full term in the Eighty-second Congress, losing to the Democratic candidate. Guill was a delegate to the 1952 Republican National Convention, which met in Chicago to nominate the Eisenhower-Nixon ticket.

From 1953 to 1955, Guill served as the executive assistant in Washington, D.C., to Arthur Summerfield, the United States Postmaster General. From 1955 to 1959, he was a member of the United States Federal Maritime Board in the United States Department of Commerce.

Guill died on January 15, 1994, in Pampa, Texas, and is interred there at Fairview Cemetery.

The next Republican to hold the Panhandle U.S. House seat was Bob Price, also from Pampa. He was elected to four terms beginning in 1966.

Sources

1909 births
1994 deaths
United States Navy personnel of World War II
West Texas A&M University alumni
Businesspeople from Texas
People from Smyrna, Tennessee
People from Pampa, Texas
Republican Party members of the United States House of Representatives from Texas
20th-century American businesspeople
20th-century American politicians